François Marque (born 31 July 1983) is a French professional footballer who plays as a defender for Swiss club FC Stade-Payerne.

Football career
Marque was born in Troyes. He started his career in his native France with amateur club RCS La Chapelle in 2002 where he played 55 games over the course of two seasons. His good performances there caught the eye of Ligue 2 club FC Libourne-Saint-Seurin for whom he signed for in 2004. Marque did not play any games there and left after just one season to join Swiss Challenge League side FC Baulmes in 2005. He impressed at Baulmes and gathered interest from several Swiss Super League teams. On 12 November 2006 Baulmes played in the Swiss Cup third round against Basel, who needed extra time to win the match 3–2 and proceed to the next round. Therefore, Basel were also one of the clubs who showed an interest in the centre back.

After much speculation about his future Marque joined FC Basel in January 2007. At first, on 24. January, he signed a contract that was valid from July 2007 until 30 June 2010. But then Bruno Berner transferred out from Basel, to Blackburn Rovers for a nominal fee, and this move required an immediate replacement. So, in agreement with FC Baulmes, FCB made use of their opportunity to take over the defender with an immediate effect. A corresponding agreement with all parties was reached on 30 January, which meant that Marque was immediately available. He joined Basel's first team during the winter break of their 2007–08 season under head coach Christian Gross.

During his first six months with the club, Marque played just two league and one cup games. He played his league debut with the team in the away game in the Hardturm on 4 March as Basel won 5–1 against Grasshopper Club coming on as substitute for Scott Chipperfield. Basel ended the league season as runners-up and the Swiss Cup as winners. Marque played the full 90 minutes in the semi-final against Wil but was on the bench during the final.

During the 2007–08 season Marque progressed and formed an effective central defensive partnership with Sweden international Daniel Majstorović and this saw him become a first-team regular. Basel played in the 2007–08 UEFA Cup. Winning both matches in the qualification and both matches in the play-off round, they ended the group stage undefeated in second position to advance to the knockout stage. But then they were eliminated here by Sporting CP. Marque played the full 90 minutes in all ten games. At the end of the 2007–08 season he won the Double with the club. They won the League Championship title with four points advantage over second placed Young Boys. In the Swiss Cup via FC Léchelles, SC Binningen, Grasshopper Club, Stade Nyonnais and in the semi-final Thun, Basel advanced to the final, and winning this 4–1 against AC Bellinzona they won the competition.

Majstorović left Basel in Summer 2008 and Marque formed a new partnership with David Abraham. To the beginning of the season, they were members of the Basel team that won the Uhrencup. They beat Legia Warsaw 6–1 and played a 2–2 draw with Borussia Dortmund to end the table on top slot above Dortmund and Luzern.

Basel joined the 2008–09 UEFA Champions League in the second qualifying round and with an aggregate score of 5–3 they eliminated IFK Göteborg. In the next round they played against Vitória de Guimarães. The first leg ended in a goalless draw, but with a 2–1 win in the second leg they eliminated Vitória and advanced to the group stage. Here Basel were matched with Barcelona, Sporting CP and Shakhtar Donetsk but ended the group in last position winning just one point after a 1–1 draw in Camp Nou. Marque played in nine of the ten games, missing only the away game to Sporting due to an injury. At the end of the 2008–09 Super League season Basel were third in the table, seven points behind new champions Zürich and one adrift of runners-up Young Boys. Marque suffered a cruciate ligament rupture in an away match in April and missed the last nine games of the season. In the 2008–09 Swiss Cup Basel advanced via Schötz, Bulle, Thun and Zurich to the semi-finals. But here they were stopped by YB. After a goalless 90 minutes and extra time, YB decided the penalty shoot-out 3–2 and advanced to the final to become runners-up, as Sion became cup winners.

Marque missed all the games during the first half of the following season due to the ligament injury and after he recovered, he moved on. During his time with the team Marque played a total of 120 games for Basel scoring one goal. 58 of these games were in the Swiss Super League, eight in the Swiss Cup, 19 in the UEFA competitions (Champions League and Europa League) and 35 were friendly games. He scored his one-goal during a test game.

On 1 February 2010, the central defender signed a three-and-a-half-year contract with Grenoble Foot. On 19 July 2011, he played in a friendly for Crystal Palace. On 5 August 2011, he signed with French second league team SC Bastia. In October 2013 he signed for 1. FC Saarbrücken but was released four months later after failing a doping test.

Marque signed for S.League side Brunei DPMM FC for the 2017 S.League season. His debut on 3 March against Home United only lasted half-an-hour as he went off with an injury, but not before conceding a penalty. He was released later that month and was replaced by Serbian Željko Savić.

Honours
Basel
 Swiss Cup: 2008
 Swiss Super League: 2008
 Uhren Cup: 2008

References

External links
 
 Profile at FC Basel 
 Profile at Swiss Football League Website 

1983 births
Living people
Sportspeople from Troyes
Footballers from Grand Est
Association football defenders
French footballers
French expatriate footballers
FC Libourne players
FC Basel players
Grenoble Foot 38 players
SC Bastia players
1. FC Saarbrücken players
Amiens SC players
FC Istres players
DPMM FC players
FC Stade Nyonnais players
Ligue 1 players
Ligue 2 players
Swiss Super League players
3. Liga players
Expatriate footballers in Brunei
Expatriate footballers in Switzerland
Expatriate footballers in Germany
French expatriate sportspeople in Switzerland
French expatriate sportspeople in Germany